Ivana Žnidarić (born 1985) is a Croatian model. She was Miss Croatia in 2004 and competed at Miss World 2004.

References

1985 births
Living people
People from Čakovec
Miss World 2004 delegates
Croatian female models
Croatian beauty pageant winners